Taqbil or Taqbeel is a tradition to require non Sayyids to kiss the hand of Sayyids, mostly in Hadhrami people of Yemen.

Description
Taqbil in Arabic literally means Kissing.  In Hadhramaut, the Sayyid people receive gestures of respect from the rest of population in recognition of their descent from Muhammad. These gestures include the method of greeting, in which their hand (usually right hand) is kissed and/or sniffed.  This hand-kissing is performed even when the recipient is still a child or a person without any special distinction in terms of religious knowledge or piety, in recognition of the nobility of the bloodline rather than the merits of the particular individual.  This tradition of Taqbil was called Shamma in Hadhramaut.

In the nineteenth and twentieth centuries, some members of the Sada continued to put forth justifications for their special treatment.  One of the prominent jurisprudents at the time, Abdurrahman bin Muhammad al-Mashhoor addressed the matter of the special status of the Sada in Hadhramaut.  He asserted that "the descendants of the Prophet were the most favored of people, and the descendants of 'Alawi the most favored of them all" because of religious learning and practice, their high moral standing, their blessedness and their piety.  In response to a question as to the correctness of the practice of kissing the hands of Sada, he asserted that it was correct according to Shafi'i authorities.

The tradition currently is no longer common among Hadhrami, except when a person greets a respected Sayyid out of paying respect to his knowledge-ability or piety  (such as to a Habib or a Shaikh) .

References

Islamic jurisprudence
Arabic words and phrases in Sharia
Traditions
Islamic terminology